Bawah Barracks is a settlement in Tamale for personnel of the Northern Ghana Airbase of Ghana Air Force branch of the Ghana Armed Forces.

References

Military installations of Ghana
Suburbs of Tamale, Ghana